Timothy Manning (Irish: Tadhg Ó Mongáin) (November 15, 1909 – June 23, 1989) was an Irish American prelate of the Roman Catholic Church. He served as Archbishop of Los Angeles from 1970 to 1985, and was elevated to the cardinalate in 1973.

Early life and ministry
Timothy Manning was born in Ballingeary, Ireland, to Cornelius and Margaret (née Cronin) Manning. Originally attending Mungret College in Limerick, he followed a call for priests in the United States and entered St. Patrick Seminary in Menlo Park, California, in 1928. Manning was ordained on June 16, 1934, and then furthered his studies at the Pontifical Gregorian University in Rome, obtaining his doctorate in canon law in 1938.

Upon his return to the States, he did pastoral work in the Archdiocese of Los Angeles, also serving as secretary to Archbishop John Joseph Cantwell from 1938 to 1946. Manning was raised to the rank of Privy Chamberlain of His Holiness on April 15, 1943, and later Domestic Prelate of His Holiness on November 17, 1945. He became chancellor for the Archdiocese on March 19, 1946.

Episcopal career
On August 3, 1946, Manning was appointed Auxiliary Bishop of Los Angeles and Titular Bishop of Lesvi by Pope Pius XII. He received his episcopal consecration on the following October 15 from Bishop Joseph Thomas McGucken, with Bishops James Edward Walsh, MM, and Thomas Arthur Connolly serving as co-consecrators.

He became vicar general of the Archdiocese on November 29, 1955, and attended the Second Vatican Council from 1962 to 1965.

Bishop of Fresno
Manning was named the first Bishop of Fresno on October 16, 1967. During his tenure, he supported the organization of a labor union for Central Valley farm workers, and sought to help wine producers and grape pickers reconcile their differences.

Archbishop of Los Angeles
After less than two years in Fresno, Manning was named Coadjutor Archbishop of Los Angeles and Titular Archbishop of Capreae on May 26, 1969. He succeeded James Francis McIntyre as the third Archbishop of Los Angeles on January 21, 1970. While a strong proponent of ecclesiastical authority, Manning took a more gentle style than his predecessor. The end of McIntyre's tenure saw tensions with the clergy and minorities and, following Manning's ascension, the new Archbishop stated, "My first reaction was to make it known that I was here to listen." He instituted ministries for blacks and Hispanics, a presbyterial council to grant the clergy greater participation in the governance of the Archdiocese, and an Inter-Parochial Council to extend the same participation to the laity. Shortly after becoming Archbishop, a majority of the Sisters of the Immaculate Heart of Mary, who had feuded with McIntyre, left the religious life and founded a lay community.  He also supported the 1973 merger of the all-male Loyola University and all-female Marymount College into Loyola Marymount University in 1973; McIntyre had resisted attempts to allow co-education in the Archdiocese's Catholic university and colleges.

Pope Paul VI created him Cardinal-Priest of S. Lucia a Piazza d'Armi in the consistory of March 5, 1973. During the Vietnam War, Manning counseled young men on their right to become conscientious objectors. Staunchly anti-abortion, the Archbishop declared that any Catholic who cooperated in an abortion would suffer excommunication from the Church, including the mother herself. In 1974, in response to the Supreme Court's ruling on Roe v. Wade, he testified before the Subcommittee on Constitutional Amendments of the Senate Judiciary Committee, saying, "An amendment is necessary first of all to protect the lives of the unborn children who can be killed—indeed, are being killed at this very moment—in the wake of the Supreme Court's decisions. But it is also needed to restore integrity to the law itself, to make the American legal system once more the guarantor and protector of all human rights and the human rights of all."

Manning was one of the cardinal electors who participated in the conclaves of August and October 1978, which selected Popes John Paul I and John Paul II respectively. Before entering the August conclave, he noted that the Church "has no political support in many places" and called for a pope who could "change people through warmth." In 1981, John Paul II sent him as a special papal envoy to the celebration in Drogheda, Ireland of the third centennial of Saint Oliver Plunkett's martyrdom. He called for a halt to the deportation of Salvadoran civil war refugees in 1983.

Later life and death
After fifteen years in Los Angeles, Manning retired as Archbishop on June 4, 1985. He took up residence at Holy Family Parish in South Pasadena.

Manning died on June 23, 1989 at the Norris Cancer Hospital of the University of Southern California, aged 79. He is buried at Calvary Cemetery in East Los Angeles.

References

External links

Roman Catholic Archdiocese of Los Angeles

20th-century American cardinals
American Roman Catholic clergy of Irish descent
Roman Catholic archbishops of Los Angeles
Participants in the Second Vatican Council
Cardinals created by Pope Paul VI
Irish emigrants to the United States
Saint Patrick's Seminary and University alumni
1909 births
1989 deaths
Burials at Calvary Cemetery (Los Angeles)
American anti-abortion activists